The Bolvașnița is a right tributary of the river Timiș in Romania. It discharges into the Timiș in Valea Timișului.

References

Rivers of Romania
Rivers of Caraș-Severin County